The 14th Annual Grammy Awards were held March 14, 1972, and were broadcast live on television in the United States by ABC; the following year, they would move the telecasts to CBS, where they remain to this date. They recognized accomplishments by musicians from the year 1971.

Award winners

General field
 Record of the Year
Lou Adler (producer) & Carole King for "It's Too Late"
 Album of the Year
Lou Adler (producer) & Carole King for Tapestry
 Song of the Year
Carole King (songwriter) for "You've Got a Friend"
 Best New Artist
Carly Simon

Children's

Best Recording for Children
Bill Cosby for Bill Cosby Talks to Kids About Drugs

Classical

Best Classical Performance – Orchestra
Carlo Maria Giulini (conductor) & the Chicago Symphony Orchestra for Mahler: Symphony No. 1 in D 
Best Classical Vocal Soloist Performance
Leontyne Price for Leontyne Price Sings Robert Schumann
Best Opera Recording
Richard Mohr (producer), Erich Leinsdorf (conductor), Grace Bumbry, Plácido Domingo, Sherrill Milnes, Leontyne Price, Ruggero Raimondi, the John Aldis Choir & the London Symphony Orchestra for Verdi: Aida
Best Choral Performance, Classical
Colin Davis (conductor), Russell Burgess, Arthur Oldham (choir directors) the Wandsworth School Boys Choir & the London Symphony Orchestra & Chorus for Berlioz: Requiem
Best Classical Performance – Instrumental Soloist or Soloists (with orchestra)
André Previn (conductor), Julian Bream & the London Symphony Orchestra for Villa-Lobos: Concerto for Guitar
Best Classical Performance – Instrumental Soloist or Soloists (without orchestra)
Vladimir Horowitz for Horowitz Plays Rachmaninoff (Etudes-Tableaux Piano Music; Sonatas)
Best Chamber Music Performance
The Juilliard String Quartet for Debussy: Quartet in G Minor/Ravel: Quartet in F
 Album of the Year, Classical
Thomas Frost, Richard Killough (producers) & Vladimir Horowitz for Horowitz Plays Rachmaninoff (Etudes-Tableaux Piano Music; Sonatas)

Comedy

Best Comedy Recording
Lily Tomlin for This Is a Recording

Composing and arranging

Best Instrumental Composition
Michel LeGrand (composer) for "Theme From Summer of '42"
Best Original Score Written for a Motion Picture or a Television Special
Isaac Hayes (composer) for Shaft
Best Instrumental Arrangement
Isaac Hayes & Johnny Allen (arrangers) for "Theme From Shaft" performed by  Isaac Hayes
Best Arrangement Accompanying Vocalist(s)
Paul McCartney (arranger) for "Uncle Albert/Admiral Halsey" performed by Paul & Linda McCartney

Country

Best Country Vocal Performance, Female
Sammi Smith for "Help Me Make It Through the Night"
Best Country Vocal Performance, Male
Jerry Reed for "When You're Hot, You're Hot"
Best Country Vocal Performance by a Duo or Group
Loretta Lynn & Conway Twitty for "After the Fire Is Gone"
Best Country Instrumental Performance
Chet Atkins for "Snowbird"
Best Country Song
Kris Kristofferson (songwriter) for "Help Me Make It Through the Night" performed by Sammi Smith

Folk

Best Ethnic or Traditional Recording
Muddy Waters for They Call Me Muddy Waters

Gospel

Best Gospel Performance (other than soul gospel)
Charley Pride for "Let Me Live"
Best Soul Gospel Performance
Shirley Caesar for Put Your Hand in the Hand of the Man From Galilee
Best Sacred Performance
Charley Pride for Did You Think to Pray

Jazz

Best Jazz Performance by a Soloist
Bill Evans for The Bill Evans Album performed by the Bill Evans Trio
Best Jazz Performance by a Group
Bill Evans for The Bill Evans Album performed by the Bill Evans Trio
Best Jazz Performance by a Big Band
Duke Ellington for "New Orleans Suite"

Musical show

Best Score From an Original Cast Show Album
Stephen Schwartz (composer & producer) & the original cast for Godspell

Packaging and notes

Best Album Cover
Dean O. Torrence (art director) & Gene Brownell (photographer) for Pollution performed by Pollution
Best Album Notes
Sam Samudio (notes writer) for Sam, Hard and Heavy performed by Sam Samudio

Pop

Best Pop Vocal Performance, Female
Carole King for Tapestry
Best Pop Vocal Performance, Male
James Taylor for "You've Got a Friend"
 Best Pop Vocal Performance by a Duo or Group
 The Carpenters for Carpenters
Best Pop Instrumental Performance
Quincy Jones for Smackwater Jack

Production and engineering

Best Engineered Recording, Non-Classical
Henry Bush, Ron Capone & Dave Purple (engineers) for "Theme From Shaft" performed by Isaac Hayes
Best Classical Engineered Recording
Vittorio Negri (engineer), Colin Davis (conductor), the Wandsworth School Boys Choir & the London Symphony Orchestra for Berlioz: Requiem

R&B

Best R&B Vocal Performance, Female
Aretha Franklin for "Bridge Over Troubled Water"
Best R&B Vocal Performance, Male
Lou Rawls for "A Natural Man"
Best R&B Vocal Performance by a Group
Ike & Tina Turner for "Proud Mary"
Best Rhythm & Blues Song
Bill Withers for "Ain't No Sunshine"

Spoken

Best Spoken Word Recording
Les Crane for Desiderata

References

External links
14th Grammy Awards at the Internet Movie Database

 014
1972 music awards
1972 in New York City
1972 in American music
March 1972 events in the United States
1970s in Manhattan